Christoph Hoffmann (born 9 December 1957) is a German politician of the Free Democratic Party (FDP) who has been serving as a member of the Bundestag from the state of Baden-Württemberg since 2017.

Early life and career 
Hoffmann studied forestry sciences at the University of Freiburg after graduating from high school in 1977. He graduated with a diploma in forestry in 1983, and then completed his preparatory service for a forestry career with the state of Baden-Württemberg in 1985. After completing his doctoral studies in forest genetics at the University of California, Berkeley, Hoffmann was awarded his doctorate at the University of Göttingen in 1994. 

From 1995 until 1997, Hoffmann worked for GIZ in Ivory Coast. He was subsequently employed in various projects and positions in the Baden-Württemberg forest administration.

Political career 
In 2007, Hoffmann was elected mayor of the community of Bad Bellingen in the Markgräflerland region and re-elected in 2015.

Hoffmann became member of the Bundestag in the 2017 German federal election. He has since been a member of the Committee on Economic Cooperation and Development and the Parliamentary Advisory Board on Sustainable Development. He serves as his parliamentary group’s spokesperson on development policy.

In addition to his committee assignments, Hoffmann is part of the German-Ukrainian Parliamentary Friendship Group and the German Parliamentary Friendship Group for Relations with the Western African States. He has also been a substitute member of the German delegation to the Parliamentary Assembly of the Council of Europe (PACE) since 2018, where he serves on the Committee on Social Affairs, Health and Sustainable Development. Since 2022, he has been a member of the German delegation to the Franco-German Parliamentary Assembly.

Other activities 
 German Network against Neglected Tropical Diseases (DNTDs), Member of the Parliamentary Advisory Board (since 2018)
 German Africa Foundation (DAS), Member of the Board (since 2018)
 German Foundation for World Population (DSW), Member of the Parliamentary Advisory Board (since 2018)
 St Barbara Foundation, Member of the Board of Trustees

References

External links 

  
 Bundestag biography 
 

1957 births
Living people
Members of the Bundestag for Baden-Württemberg
Members of the Bundestag 2017–2021
Members of the Bundestag for the Free Democratic Party (Germany)
Members of the Bundestag 2021–2025